Lamine Mohamed Diaby (born 3 September 1996) is a French professional footballer who plays for Portimonense.

References

Living people
1996 births
People from Grasse
Sportspeople from Alpes-Maritimes
Association football midfielders
French footballers
S.C. Salgueiros players
C.D. Santa Clara players
F.C. Paços de Ferreira players
Portimonense S.C. players
Primeira Liga players
Campeonato de Portugal (league) players
Liga Portugal 2 players
French expatriate footballers
French expatriate sportspeople in Portugal
Expatriate footballers in Portugal
Footballers from Provence-Alpes-Côte d'Azur